Anika Schwörer (born 1 June 2001) is a Swiss volleyball player. 
She is a member of the Women's National Team.
She participated at the  2018 Montreux Volley Masters. 
She plays for Sm’Aesch Pfeffingen.

Clubs 

  Volley Smash 05 (2018)
  Sm’Aesch Pfeffingen (2019)

References

External links 

 FIVB Profile
 
 Anika Schwörer neu in der Damen-Nationalmannschaft
 Anika Schwörer: «Ich bin sehr ehrgeizig, was meine Stärke und meine Schwäche ist»

2001 births
Living people
Swiss women's volleyball players
Place of birth missing (living people)